Kehlhof is a village near Rapperswil, Switzerland. It is located on the north bank of the lake of Zurich and is part of the political municipality of Stäfa. In the local dialect it is called Chälhof.

There is an old mansion (Villa Sunneshy) located at the lake shore. This mansion is owned by the municipality and now a cultural centre.

External links 
 Official Page 

Stäfa
Villages in the canton of Zürich
Populated places on Lake Zurich